David Malcolm (1938–2014) was an Australian politician.

David Malcolm may also refer to:
Sir David Peter Michael Malcolm, 11th Baronet (1919–1995) of the Malcolm Baronets
Sheriff Dave Malcolm (died 1946), victim of George Sitts

See also